Lazar Branković (c. 1421 – 20 February 1458) was a Serbian despot, prince of Rascia from 1456 to 1458. He was the third son of Đurađ Branković and his wife Eirene Kantakouzene. He was succeeded by his elder brother, despot Stefan III Branković.

Biography
Both Grgur and Stefan, his older brothers, were blinded by orders of Murad II in 1441. Lazar apparently became the heir to their father as the only son not to be handicapped. Đurađ died on 24 December 1456. Lazar succeeded him as planned.

According to Fine, his brief reign mostly included family quarrels with his mother and siblings. In 1457, Lazar gave an oath of subservience to Mehmed II, son and successor of Murad II. Fine considers this to be an attempt to prevent an Ottoman invasion. His only other decision of consequence was to appoint Mihailo Anđelović, a member of the Angelos family, as his chief official. Mihailo briefly served as head of a regency council following the death of his lord.

Lazar died on 20 February 1458. George Sphrantzes recorded the date but not the cause.

Family
Lazar and his relations are named in "Dell'Imperadori Constantinopolitani", a manuscript held in the Vatican Library. The document is also known as the "Massarelli manuscript" because it was found in the papers of Angelo Massarelli (1510–1566). Masarelli is better known as the general secretary of the Council of Trent, who recorded the daily occurrings of the council.

The Massarelli manuscript names him as a son of Đurađ Branković and Eirene Kantakouzene. "The Byzantine Lady: Ten Portraits 1250-1500" (1994) by D. M. Nicol questioned his maternity, suggesting Đurađ had a prior marriage to a daughter of John IV of Trebizond. However his theory presented no sources and failed to take into account that John IV was born between 1395 and 1417. He was unlikely to be a grandparent by the 1410s.

On 11 September 1429, Đurađ made a donation to Esphigmenou Monastery at Mount Athos. 
The charter for the document names his wife Irene and five children. The Masarelli manuscript also names the same five children of Đurađ and Eirene. Other genealogies mention a sixth child, Todor Branković. He could be a child who died young and thus not listed with his siblings.

The oldest sibling listed in the Massarelli document was Grgur Branković. The 1429 document mentions him with the title of Despot. According to "The Late Medieval Balkans, A Critical Survey from the Late Twelfth Century to the Ottoman Conquest" (1994) by J. V. A. Fine, Grgur was appointed governor of territories of southern Serbia associated to the House of Branković. He was reportedly appointed by Murad II of the Ottoman Empire in 1439. In April 1441, Grgur was accused of plotting against Murad and his governorship terminated. He was imprisoned in Amasya and blinded on 8 May 1441. According to "Monumenta Serbica Spectantia Historiam Serbiae, Bosniae, Ragusii" (1858) by Franz Miklosich, Grgur and his brothers co-signed a charter by which Đurađ confirmed the privileges of the Republic of Ragusa. The charted was dated to 17 September 1445. According to the "Europäische Stammtafeln: Stammtafeln zur Geschichte der Europäischen Staaten" (1978) by Detlev Schwennicke, Grgur retired to a monastery under the monastic name "German". According to Fine, Grgur resurfaced in 1458, claiming the succession of the vacant throne of Serbia for himself or his son. The Massarelli manuscript mentioned Grgur as unwed. Later genealogies name his wife as "Jelisaveta". Vuk Grgurević, a son of Grgur, was later a titular Serbian despot (1471–1485). He was possibly an illegitimate.

The Massarelli manuscript next names an older sister of Lazar, Mara Branković. She was one of the wives of Murad II. Then are listed Stefan Branković and "Cantacuzina", a sister with the Latinized version of their mother's last name. Later genealogies give her name as Katarina. She married Ulrich II of Celje. Lazar is listed fifth and last, the youngest child of the marriage.

Marriage and children

In 1446, Lazar married Helena Palaiologina of Morea. She was a daughter of Thomas Palaiologos, Ruler of Morea, and Catherine Zaccaria of the Principality of Achaea. They had three daughters:

 Helen (Mary), wife of King Stephen Tomašević of Bosnia.
 Milica, wife of Leonardo III Tocco of Epirus.
 Jerina, wife of Gjon Kastrioti II

Ancestry

Notes

References

See also
List of Serbian monarchs

1420s births
1458 deaths
15th-century Serbian monarchs
Lazar
Eastern Orthodox monarchs
Despots of Serbia